Christiane Scrivener (born 1 September 1925 in Mulhouse, France) is a French politician, a member of Valéry Giscard d'Estaing's Parti républicain (now replaced by Alain Madelin's Démocratie libérale).

She was Secretary of State of Trade for Consumers' protection between 1976 and 1978, first in Jacques Chirac's and then in Raymond Barre's cabinet.  In this capacity she spearheaded several legislative changes, including an Act to protect the information of consumers on products and services (loi sur la protection et l'information des consommateurs de produits et de services, 1978), well known under the name of loi Scrivener.

She was then elected a Member of the European Parliament (1979–1984).

In 1989 she became the European Communities Commissioner for Taxes, Revenue Harmonization and Consumer Policies in the Delors Commission, a position she retained until 1995.

See also 
Feminism in France (for the representation of women in government)

References
guide2womenleaders.com

External links 
 

1925 births
Living people
Politicians from Mulhouse
French European Commissioners
Women European Commissioners
Government ministers of France
Women government ministers of France
MEPs for France 1979–1984
MEPs for France 1984–1989
20th-century women MEPs for France
Republican Party (France) MEPs
European Commissioners 1989–1992
European Commissioners 1993–1994